The 2000 NFL Draft was the procedure by which National Football League teams selected amateur U.S. college football players. It is officially known as the NFL Annual Player Selection Meeting. The draft was held April 15–16, 2000, at the Theater at Madison Square Garden in New York City, New York. No teams chose to claim any players in the supplemental draft that year.

The draft started with Penn State teammates Courtney Brown and LaVar Arrington being selected consecutively, making them the only Penn State players to go number one and two in the same draft. The New York Jets had four first-round draft picks, the most by any team in the history of the draft (17 teams have had three picks but no other has had four).

The draft was notable for the selection of Michigan quarterback Tom Brady at the 199th pick in the sixth round by the New England Patriots. In his twenty-two seasons as a starter, Brady has won three NFL MVP awards, a record seven (6 with the Patriots) Super Bowl titles and five Super Bowl MVPs. As a result of his late selection and subsequent success, Brady is considered to be the biggest steal in the history of the NFL draft, and is widely considered to be the greatest NFL player of all time. It was also the first year since 1966 that a pure placekicker was drafted in the first round, with the Oakland Raiders selecting Florida State's Sebastian Janikowski 17th overall. The University of Tennessee led all colleges with nine selections in the 2000 NFL draft.

Player selections

Trades
In the explanations below, (D) denotes trades that took place during the 2000 Draft, while (PD) indicates trades completed pre-draft.

Round one

Round two

Round three

Round four

Round five

Round six

Round seven
-->

Forfeited picks

Notable undrafted players

Hall of Famers

 Brian Urlacher, linebacker from New Mexico, taken 1st round 9th overall by the Chicago Bears.
Inducted: Professional Football Hall of Fame Class of 2018.

References and notes
Notes

Trade references

General references

External links
 2000 NFL draft

2000
NFL Draft
Draft
Madison Square Garden
NFL Draft
NFL Draft
American football in New York City
2000s in Manhattan
Sporting events in New York City